Anatoliy Serhiyovych Romanchenko (born 19 May 2001) is a Ukrainian professional footballer who plays as a midfielder for FC Chernihiv in the Ukrainian Second League.

Career

FC Chernihiv
In 2020 Romanchenko joined FC Chernihiv in the Ukrainian Second League. On 19 September he scored his first goal against Karpaty Lviv. On 4 June 2021 he scored by penalty against Chaika. On 6 June he has been included in the Best XI of Round 25 of the 2020-21 Ukrainian Second League.

Career statistics

Club

References

External links
 Anatoliy Romanchenko at FC Chernigiv 
 
 

2001 births
Living people
Footballers from Chernihiv
Ukrainian footballers
Association football midfielders
FC Chernihiv players
Ukrainian Second League players
Ukrainian First League players